Nabachandra Singh (born 1 March 1986) is an Indian footballer who plays as midfielder for Royal Wahingdoh FC.

Career statistics

References

1986 births
Living people
Indian footballers
Royal Wahingdoh FC players
I-League players
Footballers from Manipur
Association football midfielders